National Council of Greek Women is a Greek women's organization, founded in 1908. 

The ESE was founded by Kalliroi Parren. Parren had founded the Union for the Emancipation of Women  in 1894, but the ESE was to become a national organization.
ESE was the first national women's organization in Greece. It functioned as an umbrella organization, uniting the many local women's organizations of Greece. The focus of the ESE were education and professional rights. It avoided the issue of women's suffrage, which was seen as too provocative, and therefore the Greek League for Women's Rights  was founded by Avra Theodoropoulou in 1920 to address that issue.

References

 Francisca de Haan, Krassimira Daskalova and Anna Loutfi, A Biographical Dictionary of Women's Movements and Feminisms: Central, Eastern, and South Eastern Europe, 19th and 20th Centuries. CEU Press, 2006.
 Demetra Samou, So Difficult to be Considered as Citizens: The History of Women's Suffrage in Greece, 1864-2001. In Blanca Rodriguez Ruiz and Ruth Rubio-Marín, The Struggle for Female Suffrage in Europe: Voting to Become Citizens, BRILL, 2012, pp.939–. 
 Krassimira Daskalova, Balkans', in Bonnie G. Smith, The Oxford Encyclopedia of Women in World History, Oxford University Press, 2008, pp.185–.

Feminist organizations in Greece
Organizations established in 1908
Women's organizations based in Greece
1908 in Greece